Summer Night Theater is a weekly television series broadcast on DuMont beginning July 7, 1953, and ending July 28, 1953,.

Synopsis
This 30-minute series featured filmed dramas with Lloyd Bridges and Gale Storm among the stars.It was broadcast at 10 p.m. Eastern Time. After its four-week run on DuMont, it was broadcast in New York through the rest of summer 1953.

See also
List of programs broadcast by the DuMont Television Network
List of surviving DuMont Television Network broadcasts
1948-49 United States network television schedule

Bibliography
David Weinstein, The Forgotten Network: DuMont and the Birth of American Television (Philadelphia: Temple University Press, 2004) 
Alex McNeil, Total Television, Fourth edition (New York: Penguin Books, 1980) 
Tim Brooks and Earle Marsh, The Complete Directory to Prime Time Network TV Shows, Third edition (New York: Ballantine Books, 1964)

References

External links
Summer Night Theater at IMDB

DuMont Television Network original programming
1948 American television series debuts
1948 American television series endings
Black-and-white American television shows
Lost American television shows